The Life of Fish is a 2010 Chilean drama film directed by Matías Bize. The film was selected as the Chilean entry for the Best Foreign Language Film at the 83rd Academy Awards, but didn't make the final shortlist.

The Life of Fish won the award for Best Spanish Language Foreign Film at the 25th Goya Awards.

Plot
Andrés (Santiago Cabrera) has been living in Germany for 10 years. He returns to Chile to put his past behind him before settling permanently in Berlin. During his stay, he attends the birthday party of one of his friends, where he rediscovers a whole world he had stopped seeing, including Beatriz (Blanca Lewin), his great love. This reunion could change Andrés' life forever and be necessary to reveal secrets and shed light on very dark lies.

Cast
 Santiago Cabrera as Andrés
 Blanca Lewin as Beatriz
 Antonia Zegers as Mariana
 Víctor Montero as Pablo
 Sebastián Layseca as Ignacio
 Juan Pablo Miranda as Roberto
 Luz Jiménez as Guille
 María Gracia Omegna as Carolina
 Alicia Rodríguez as Daniela
 Francisca Cárdenas as Maca
 Diego Fontecilla as Jorge

See also
 List of submissions to the 83rd Academy Awards for Best Foreign Language Film
 List of Chilean submissions for the Academy Award for Best Foreign Language Film

References

External links

2010 films
2010s Spanish-language films
2010 drama films
Chilean drama films